Anton is an unincorporated community and U.S. Post Office in Washington County, Colorado, United States.  The ZIP Code of the Anton Post Office is 80801.

History
Anton was established about 1915.  The Anton Post Office opened on July 18, 1916.

Geography
Anton is located at  (39.741250,-103.217754).

See also

Outline of Colorado
Index of Colorado-related articles
State of Colorado
Colorado cities and towns
Colorado counties
Washington County, Colorado

References

External links

Unincorporated communities in Washington County, Colorado
Unincorporated communities in Colorado